Michael Whyte may refer to:

Michael Whyte (musician) in Attaxe (band)
Michael Whyte (filmmaker), director of The Railway Station Man
Mike Whyte, of Camber Corporation

See also
Michael White (disambiguation)
Michael Wight (born 1964), cricketer